The 7th World Table Tennis Championships were held in Baden bei Wien from 31 January to 5 February 1933.

Medalists

Team

Individual

References

External links
ITTF Museum

World Table Tennis Championships
World Table Tennis Championships
World Table Tennis Championships
Table tennis competitions in Austria
International sports competitions hosted by Austria